Stiphidion facetum is a species of spider in the genus Stiphidion native to Australia and also found in New Zealand.

See also
 List of Stiphidiidae species

Invasions
This species of spider is extremely competitive and ready to invade foreign webs. They are knowledgeable in understanding that already existing spider webs are made in prey rich environments so there are always incoming resources. The species that are more likely to survive invading another's home are the larger sheet web spiders[3].

Diet
This species are greatly effected by their mother. Depending on the maternal diet it will drastically influence its survivorship. When the female consumes high protein prey their offspring are more likely to survive longer, daughters were more reproductively successful, and grew much faster[4].

References

3. EICHENBERGER, B., SIEGENTHALER, E., & SCHMIDT-ENTLING, M. H. (2009). Body size determines the outcome of competition for webs among alien and native sheetweb spiders (Araneae: Linyphiidae). Ecological Entomology, 34(3), 363–368. 

4. Wen, L., Zhang, Z., Zhang, S., Liu, F., Jiao, X., & Li, D. (2020). Influence of maternal diet on offspring survivorship, growth, and reproduction in a sheetweb spider. Biology Open, 9(11). 

Stiphidiidae
Spiders of Australia
Spiders of New Zealand
Spiders described in 1902